Medan Independent School (MIS), formerly Medan International School (MIS), is an international school in Medan, Indonesia. It was founded in 1969.

Overview

The school occupies a  site approximately 10 km from the heart of Medan. The school's facilities include 23 classrooms, a laboratory, two drama rooms, music rooms, two computer labs, a gymnasium, a 50-metre outdoor swimming pool, and a football pitch.

Accreditation and membership
Medan Independent School is an IB World School, recognised and accredited by the following organizations:
Western Association of Schools and Colleges (WASC)
International Baccalaureate Organization (IBO)

External links 

Official Website

References 

International schools in Indonesia
International Baccalaureate schools in Indonesia
Education in North Sumatra
Educational institutions established in 1969
1969 establishments in Indonesia